Omar Craddock (born April 26, 1991) is an American track and field athlete who competes in the triple jump. With the University of Florida he won one indoor and two outdoor NCAA titles in the event. He competed alongside Christian Taylor and Will Claye in a succession of elite level triple jumpers to come from the Florida Gators track and field team.

He was the bronze medalist at the 2010 World Junior Championships in Athletics. In 2013 he won the national triple jump title at the USA Outdoor Track and Field Championships. His personal best for the triple jump is 17.68 m (58 ft .06 in).

Career

Early life
Raised in Killeen, Texas, he attended Killeen High School and enjoyed basketball, American football and baseball. He began to achieve good marks in the triple jump in 2008 – his best that year was 15.53 m, which brought him second at the AAU Junior Olympic Games. He was also the state champion in the event in 2008.

College athletics
He gained an athletics scholarship at the University of Florida and began to compete collegiately for the Florida Gators track and field team. In his first year there he quickly established himself as one of the school's best ever jumpers. He jumped  (his first over sixteen metres) to take third at the Southeastern Conference indoor championship and placed seventh at the NCAA Indoor Championship. He was runner-up at the Florida Relays, won at the Penn Relays. A second-place finish at the 2010 SEC Outdoor Championship helped the Florida Gators to their first team title in over twenty years. A sixth-place finish at the NCAA Outdoor Championship gave Craddock his second All-American honour for the year.

The 2011 collegiate season began with school-best performances : at the SEC Indoor Championships the Florida Gators swept the men's triple jump through Christian Taylor, Will Claye and Craddock. He came fifth at the NCAA Indoors and won his first outdoor meet at the Penn Relays, but missed the rest of the outdoor season. In his third year with the Gators he reached new highs as his teammates Taylor and Claye finished their studies. An outdoor best of  followed and he secured both the SEC and NCAA Outdoor titles too – following in the footsteps of Taylor's 2010 feat. He placed fourth at the 2012 Olympic Trials, where his former Gator teammates took the top spots.

In his fourth and final year at Florida, Craddock found strong competition indoors. At the SEC Indoors he jumped  but was narrowly beaten by Tarik Batchelor. In the outdoor season Craddock began an undefeated streak, starting at the Texas Relays. He got the better of Will Claye at the 2013 USA Outdoor Track and Field Championships to win his first national title in a wind-assisted .

Personal bests
Triple jump (outdoor):  (2019)
Triple jump (outdoor):  (2015)
Triple jump (outdoor):  (2013)
Triple jump (outdoor): w (2014)
Triple jump (indoor):  (2013)
Long jump (indoor):  (2013)

National titles
NCAA Indoor titles: 2012
NCAA Outdoor titles: 2012, 2013
USA Outdoor titles: 2013, 2015

International competitions

References

External links
Official website

Living people
1991 births
Sportspeople from Killeen, Texas
Track and field athletes from Texas
American male triple jumpers
African-American male track and field athletes
World Athletics Championships athletes for the United States
Florida Gators men's track and field athletes
Athletes (track and field) at the 2019 Pan American Games
Pan American Games gold medalists for the United States
Pan American Games medalists in athletics (track and field)
Pan American Games track and field athletes for the United States
USA Outdoor Track and Field Championships winners
USA Indoor Track and Field Championships winners
Pan American Games gold medalists in athletics (track and field)
Medalists at the 2019 Pan American Games
21st-century African-American sportspeople